The 2017 Vancouver Whitecaps FC season is the club's seventh season in Major League Soccer, the top division of soccer in the United States and Canada. Including previous iterations of the franchise, this is 40th season of professional soccer being played in Vancouver under a variation of the "Whitecaps" name.

Outside of MLS, the Whitecaps played in the knockout rounds of the 2016–17 CONCACAF Champions League, where they faced fellow MLS team the New York Red Bulls in the quarterfinals. Additionally, the team played in the 2017 Canadian Championship.

Current roster

Transfers

In

Out

Major League Soccer

Preseason

Simple Invitational

Regular season

League tables

Western Conference

Overall

Results

Playoffs

Knockout Round

Conference Semifinals

CONCACAF Champions League

2016–17

Group stage 

Group stage matches were played during the 2016 Vancouver Whitecaps FC season.

Quarterfinals

Semifinals

Canadian Championship

Playing statistics

Appearances (Apps.) numbers are for appearances in competitive games only including sub appearances
Red card numbers denote:   Numbers in parentheses represent red cards overturned for wrongful dismissal.

Notes

References

Vancouver Whitecaps
Vancouver Whitecaps
Vancouver Whitecaps
Vancouver Whitecaps FC seasons